Oscar Fantenberg (born 7 October 1991) is a Swedish professional ice hockey defenceman who is currently playing for Linköping HC in the Swedish Hockey League (SHL). Undrafted, he has previously played for the Vancouver Canucks, Los Angeles Kings and Calgary Flames in the National Hockey League (NHL), in addition to playing for HC Sochi and SKA Saint Petersburg in the Kontinental Hockey League (KHL).

Playing career
Fantenberg was a product at the youth level of IF Troja-Ljungby. In 2009, he moved to HV71, where he made his debut in the Elitserien during the 2010–11 Elitserien season. After five years with the club, he signed with Frölunda HC in 2014. In his second year with Frölunda, the 2015–16 campaign, he helped win the Swedish championship and the title in the Champions Hockey League.

Fantenberg secured his first contract abroad before the 2016–17 season when he inked a one-year contract with HC Sochi of the Kontinental Hockey League (KHL). Fantenberg adapted quickly to the KHL, embracing a top-pairing role in appearing in 44 games. In contributing with three goals and 23 points, he was Sochi's initial representative to be selected for the KHL All-Star Game.

A free agent following his successful season in Sochi, Fantenberg gained NHL attention and agreed to a one-year, entry-level contract with the Los Angeles Kings on 4 May 2017.

Fantenberg participated in the Kings' rookie and main roster training camp before making his pre-season NHL debut with the Kings on 16 September 2017. In quickly adapting to the North American style, Fantenberg made the Kings opening night roster for the 2017–18 season. He made his NHL debut with the Kings, playing 17 minutes in a second-pairing role in a 2–0 victory over the Philadelphia Flyers on 5 October 2017. On 9 November 2017, he scored his first career NHL goal, coming in a 5–2 loss against the Tampa Bay Lightning.

Fantenberg made the Kings' opening roster to begin the 2018–19 season. In his first full season in the NHL, he earned a third-pairing role on the blueline and appeared in 46 games with the Kings, registering two goals and one assist. On 25 February 2019, he was traded to the Calgary Flames in exchange for a fourth-round pick in the 2020 NHL Entry Draft.

On 1 July 2019, Fantenberg left the Flames as a free agent and signed a one-year $850,000 contract with the Vancouver Canucks. Fantenberg made the Canucks roster out of training camp as the team's seventh defenceman but was unable to draw into the lineup. Fantenberg finally made his season debut on December 1, before scoring his first goal with Vancouver two nights later, in a 5–2 win over the Ottawa Senators.

On October 27, 2020, Fantenberg left the NHL and signed a one-year contract with SKA Saint Petersburg of the Kontinental Hockey League (KHL).

On 24 May 2022, Fantenberg returned to the SHL by signing a four-year contract with Linköping HC.

International play 
Fantenberg made his debut with Sweden national senior team in October 2012. He was later selected to make his full senior debut in the 2016 IIHF World Championship.

Career statistics

Regular season and playoffs

International

Awards and honours

References

External links

1991 births
Living people
Calgary Flames players
Swedish expatriate ice hockey players in the United States
Swedish expatriate ice hockey players in Canada
Frölunda HC players
HC Sochi players
HV71 players
IF Troja/Ljungby players
IK Oskarshamn players
Linköping HC players
Los Angeles Kings players
Ontario Reign (AHL) players
People from Ljungby Municipality
SKA Saint Petersburg players
Swedish ice hockey defencemen
Undrafted National Hockey League players
Utica Comets players
Vancouver Canucks players
Ice hockey players at the 2022 Winter Olympics
Olympic ice hockey players of Sweden
Sportspeople from Kronoberg County